Carousel is a 1923 Swedish silent drama film directed by Dimitri Buchowetzki and starring Walter Janssen, Aud Egede-Nissen, and Alfons Fryland. It was one of a number of circus-themed films released during the era. It was shot at the Johannisthal Studios in Berlin and on location in Sweden and Denmark.

Cast

References

Bibliography

External links

1923 films
Swedish silent feature films
Swedish drama films
1923 drama films
1920s Swedish-language films
Films directed by Dimitri Buchowetzki
Films shot in Denmark
Films shot in Germany
Films shot in Sweden
Films shot at Johannisthal Studios
Swedish black-and-white films
Silent drama films
1920s Swedish films